Her Crowning Glory is a 1911 American silent short comedy film directed by Laurence Trimble. The film is preserved by the UCLA Film and Television Archive and is included in the DVD Treasures From American Film Archives program #2, 50 Preserved Films by the National Film Preservation Foundation.

Cast
 John Bunny as Mortimer (uncredited)
 Helene Costello as Helen, the Child (uncredited)
 Mae Costello as The Nurse (uncredited)
 Flora Finch as The Governess (uncredited)
 Edith Halleran as servant/maid (uncredited)
 Kate Price as Amelia, Mortimer's Sister (uncredited)

See also
 1911 in film

References

External links

1911 films
1911 comedy films
1911 short films
Silent American comedy films
American silent short films
American black-and-white films
Vitagraph Studios short films
American comedy short films
Films directed by Laurence Trimble
1910s American films
1910s English-language films